Jagadbandhu Institution is a school for boys in South Kolkata, West Bengal, India. Jagadbandhu Institution is a Bengali medium of South Kolkata.

Affiliation 
It is affiliated to the West Bengal Board of Secondary Education for Madhyamik Pariksha (10th Board exams) and to the West Bengal Council of Higher Secondary Education for Higher Secondary Examination (12th Board exams).

History
The school was established by Jagadbandhu Roy in 1914. The first president and vice-president of the school were Asutosh Choudhury and Rai Bahadur Ramtaran Banerjee. The first secretary was Rajendra Bidyabhusan and Murlidhar Bandhopadhaya. Recently,in 2022, the 1974 batch of Higher Secondary passed students published a book about their memories of the teachers of this school. The memories revealed the sincerity, honesty and the humorous nature of the teachers in a middle class Bengali medium Kolkata school in the tumultuous decade in the city of joy. 

The school was started in the 2 storied rented house of Dhanballavh Seth.The second location was very near to the first, near Ekdalia Road and Cornfield Road. Jagadbandhu Roy donated the building. A hostel was provided. Ashutosh Mukherjee laid the foundation stone on the 2nd building. 

In 1920, Calcutta Improvement Trust decided to directly connect Rosa Road and Ballygunge Junction railway station. The authorities abolished the school building. 

This school building was demolished and after a court case against Calcutta Improvement Trust, Calcutta Improvement Trust built the 4th building. This intermediate state school was started in the rented house of Naren Mitra. In 2014 the school celebrated its centenary year.

School Secretary 
Rajendra Bidyabhusan
Murulidhar Banerjee
Surendranath Sen
Kumud Bandhu Roy (Nov, 1937 - March, 1943)
Sachidananda Bhattacharjee (April, 1943 - June, 1946)
Bholanath Roy
Tarak Chandra Das
Shibnath Roy (Nov, 1961)
Upendranath Dutta
Dilip Kumar Singha (Administrator)
Atin Bandyopadhyay (Administrator)
Nityananda Saha (Administrator)
Bireswar Roychoudhury (Administrator)
Debprakash Chakravarti
Buthadeb Bandhyapadhyay

Joint Secretary 
Rajendranath Vidyabhusan (From the very beginning - 1916)
Murulidhar Banerjee (From the very beginning - 1916)

Notable people

Notable alumni
Salil Chowdhury, music director and songwriter
Chinmoy Guha, scholar, linguist, knighted twice by the government of France, former vice-chancellor, Rabindra Bharati
Samik Bandyopadhyay, scholar and critic
Subrata Guha, test cricketer
Subrata Roy (scientist), professor, inventor, author
Tapan Raychaudhuri, historian, professor
Gajendrakumar Mitra, Author,Sahitya Academy award
Tushar Kanti Talukdar IPS, Police Commissioner, Kolkata Police
Prof. Partha Saha, molecular biologist, Saha Institute of Nuclear Physics, Kolkata

Notable teachers
Jyoti Bhusan Chaki, linguist, author, translator
Shyamal Dutta Ray, water-colour painter

Alumni association
The school alumni association was established in 1992. Kheya is its official magazine.

See also
Kamala Girls' High School, girls' school in south Kolkata, India

References

External links
List of teachers
List of students

Boys' schools in India
Primary schools in West Bengal
High schools and secondary schools in West Bengal
Schools in Kolkata
Educational institutions established in 1914
1914 establishments in British India